Thaumastomyia is a genus of horse flies in the family Tabanidae.

Species
Thaumastomyia haitiensis (Stone, 1935)

References

Brachycera genera
Tabanidae
Diptera of Asia
Taxa named by Cornelius Becker Philip